Transient receptor potential channel-interacting protein database (TRIP) is a database of protein–protein interactions for the mammalian TRP channels.

See also
 Protein-protein interactions
 TRP channels

References

External links
 http://www.trpchannel.org

Biological databases
Ion channels
Membrane biology
Proteomics